Established in 1962 on Dublin’s Tara Street, Golden Discs is Ireland’s oldest home-entertainment specialist retail chain, with twenty outlets nationwide, and an online store as of November 2019. Their current offering includes music and film in physical formats, audio playback equipment, and pop-culture merchandise.

The chain's presence around the country had diminished in the early part of the 2000s, making a significant loss by 2008  and entering examinership in 2009, with multiple store closures during this period. It returned to profitability in 2013  and has expanded its retail footprint since.

Tesco Ireland Partnership 
In November 2016 it was announced that Golden Discs concessions would move into more than half of Tesco Ireland's stores as part of a 3 year commercial agreement. "Golden Discs at Tesco" concessions operated as standalone units within Tesco stores offering CDs, DVDs and Games. The agreement made Golden Discs Ireland’s largest home-entertainment retailer with 96 locations nationwide. This agreement came to an end in 2019.

2017 
The company set about its first attempts at expansion since the introduction of austerity with the opening of three new branches in November of that year located in The Square Town Centre, Tallaght, Main Street, Wexford and a pop up shop at 52 Henry Street, Dublin 1. There was also a complete overhaul of the website to include a new web store, which gave customers more access to their full product offering.

2018 
2018 seen continued success for the business, with stores opening in Navan Town Centre Shopping Centre, Co Meath, Market Cross Shopping Centre, Kilkenny and Liffey Valley Shopping Centre, Dublin.

2019 
An increase in turnover to €13.2m and profits to €192,000 was cited as being down to an increase in sales of vinyl. 

This year the company opened new stores in Sligo, Tralee, (closed down in 2022) Drogheda and Jervis Shopping Centre, Dublin 1 while closing 1 store in Swords, Co Dublin.

Current locations 
20 branches are currently located in Dún Laoghaire Shopping Centre, Dundrum Town Centre, Stephen's Green Shopping Centre, Jervis Shopping Centre, The Square Town Centre, Tallaght, Liffey Valley Shopping Centre and Blanchardstown Centre in Co Dublin, Patrick Street Cork, Mahon Point Shopping Centre and Wilton Shopping Centre in Co. Cork, Athlone Town Centre Shopping Centre in Co. Westmeath, Showgrounds Shopping Centre Clonmel in Co. Tipperary, Johnsons Court in Sligo, Cruise's Street Limerick in Co Limerick, Navan Town Centre Shopping Centre, Co. Meath, Whitewater Shopping Centre Newbridge in Co Kildare, Main Street North Wexford, Co Wexford, Market Cross Shopping Centre in Kilkenny and City Square Shopping Centre in Waterford City in Co Waterford.

References 

 'Vinyl revival' and new stores keep profits spinning at Golden Discs
 
 Golden Discs records first profit in more than five years
 Golden Discs reports a return to profit
 Ireland’s last home-owned record store is back in the black
 Golden Discs back in Stephen's Green from Thursday

External links 
Official Site
Facebook
Instagram
Twitter

Music retailers of Ireland
Retail companies established in 1962